Pratapgarh is a census town in West Tripura district in the Indian state of Tripura.

Geography

Demographics
 India census, Pratapgarh had a population of 25,890. Males constitute 51% of the population and females 49%. Pratapgarh has an average literacy rate of 72%, higher than the national average of 59.5%: male literacy is 77%, and female literacy is 67%. In Pratapgarh, 11% of the population is under 6 years of age.

Politics
Pratapgarh assembly constituency is part of Tripura West (Lok Sabha constituency).

References

Cities and towns in West Tripura district
West Tripura district